Patrick or Pat Costello may refer to:
Pat Costello (1929–2014), American rower
Patrick Costello (Australian politician) (1824–1896), Australian businessman and politician
Patrick Costello (musician), bass player and vocalist for Dillinger Four
Patrick Costello (Irish politician) (born 1980), Irish Green Party TD
Patrick Costello (stained glass), English stained glass craftsman working with Thomas Denny (artist)

See also
Desmond Patrick Costello (1912–1964), New Zealand linguist, soldier and diplomat
Victor Costello (Victor Carton Patrick Costello, born 1970), Irish rugby union player and Olympic shot putter